Politicking in Paradise is an upcoming 2011 Bahamian comedy-thriller short film written and produced by Nathaniel Prince Lewis and his film studio Prince Lewis Projects and Directed by Devron Pinder of Diplight Media. Filmed in HD, the picture stars Nathaniel Prince Lewis (Allan Smith Jr.), Alfred Lewis (Johnny), Deniro Anderson (Andrew), LaVaughan Hamilton (Tyson) and Chelsea Blues (Kayla).

Plot
The film documents Allan Smith Jr. a young progressive running for a seat in the Bahamian House of Assembly with the help of his three best friends - a financier (Johnny) a deacon (Andrew) and a playa-playa (Tyson) and tells the story of what happens the day before the 2012 general election and the day of.

Release
The film has been submitted to screen at the Fort Lauderdale International Film Festival on location screening on Grand Bahama Island October, 2011 and will subsequently be released in Bahamian theaters November 2011.

References

External links 
 

2010s thriller films
2010s English-language films